The 1954–55 season was Djurgårdens IF's 55th in existence, their 11th season in Allsvenskan and their sixth consecutive season in the league. They were competing in Allsvenskan.

Player statistics
Appearances for competitive matches only.

|}

Goals

Total

Competitions

Overall

Allsvenskan

League table

References
http://www.fotbollsweden.se

Djurgårdens IF Fotboll seasons
Djurgarden
Swedish football championship-winning seasons